Circo Beat (Circus Beat) is the eighth studio album by Argentine musician Fito Páez, released in 1994. It was produced by Phil Manzanera. It sold 190,000 copies in Argentina.

Track listing

Personnel 
Performers
 Fito Páez – vocals, acoustic guitar, pianos, hammond, clavinet, electric keyboard
 Gabriel Carámbula – acoustic and electric guitars
 Gringui Herrera – acoustic and electric guitars, and pedal steel guitar
 Guillermo Vadalá – bass, acoustic guitar, double bass
 Geoff Dugmore: drums, bass drum and tambourin on "Dejarlas partir"
 Tweety González – accordion, piano, electric keyboard

Guest musicians 

 Fabiana Cantilo – vocals; gremlins on "El jardín donde vuelan los mares"; chorus on all other songs
 Fena Della Maggiora – vocals on "El jardín donde vuelan los mares"
 Liliana Herrero – vocals on "Las tardes del sol, las noches del agua"
 Claudia Puyó – gremlis on "El jardín donde vuelan los mares"
 Fabián Gallardo – acoustic guitar on "Dejarlas partir"
 Laura Vázquez – electric keyboard
 Alina Gandini – electric keyboard
 Pilo – harmonica on "Circo beat"
 Toots Thielemans – harmonica on "Las tardes del sol, las noches del agua" and "She's mine"
 Osvaldo Fattoruso – drums on "Las tardes del sol, las noches del agua" and "Nadie detiene al amor en un lugar"
 The Kick Horns – winds on "Circo beat"
 Simon Clark – saxophones: alto and baritone, flute
 Tim Sanders – tenor saxophone
 Simon Gardner – trombone
 Roddy Lorimer – trumpet
 Neil Sidwell – trombone

References 

1994 albums
Fito Páez albums